Public Cemetery is 1967 South Korean horror film.

Plot
A mother murders the woman who married her son, only to have her return as a ghost to get revenge.

External links
 
 

South Korean horror films
1967 films
1967 horror films